Tibor Sýkora is a Czechoslovak former slalom canoeist who competed in the 1960s. He won a gold medal in the C1 team event at the 1961 ICF Canoe Slalom World Championships in Hainsberg.

References

Czechoslovak male canoeists
Possibly living people
Year of birth missing (living people)
Medalists at the ICF Canoe Slalom World Championships